Events from the year 1801 in Scotland.

Incumbents

Law officers 
 Lord Advocate – Robert Dundas of Arniston; then Charles Hope
 Solicitor General for Scotland – Robert Blair

Judiciary 
 Lord President of the Court of Session – Lord Succoth
 Lord Justice General – The Duke of Montrose
 Lord Justice Clerk – Lord Eskgrove

Events 
 1 January – legislative union of Great Britain and Ireland completed under the Act of Union 1800, bringing about the United Kingdom of Great Britain and Ireland.
 10 March – the first British census is carried out (under terms of the Census Act 1800), with the Scottish counts undertaken by schoolmasters. The population of Scotland is determined to be 1,608,420.
 16 March – Edinburgh music teacher Anne Gunn is granted the first British patent for a board game, designed as a music teaching aid.
 4 June – Soldiers of the Ross and Cromarty Rangers fire on a mob in Aberdeen celebrating the King's birthday, killing two.
 18 July – Crinan Canal opened (although incomplete).
 First complete Bible translation into Scottish Gaelic, Am Bìoball Gàidhlig, is published.
 Dundee Courier & Argus first published.
 John Cary publishes A New Map of Scotland.
 Second Elgin Academy school building (occupied in modern times by Moray College) constructed.
 Edinburgh town council resolves to drain The Meadows.
 John Crabbie of Leith begins to deal in ginger.
 Chivas Brothers open a grocery store in Aberdeen which will blend Chivas Regal whisky.

Births 
 4 January – James Giles, landscape painter (died 1870)
 14 January – Jane Welsh Carlyle, née Jane Baillie Welsh, letter-writer (died 1866 in London)
 2 February – George Maclean, colonial governor (died 1847 in Cape Coast)
 31 May – Robert Rankin, timber merchant and shipowner (died 1870 in England)
 7 June – Charles Cowan, papermaker and Radical politician (died 1889)
 24 June – David Haggart, thief and murderer (hanged 1821)
 4 July – James Johnstone, Liberal politician (died 1888)
 21 August – Benjamin Boyd, settler in New South Wales (probably killed 1851 ln Guadalcanal)
 31 August – William Downe Gillon , Whig politician (died 1846)
 7 November – Robert Dale Owen, social reformer (died 1877 in the United States)
 Alexander Thom, almanac editor (died 1879 in Ireland)

Deaths 
 14 February – Robert Paterson ("Old Mortality"), stonemason (born 1715)
 28 March – Sir Ralph Abercromby, general (born 1734; died in Egypt)
 10 May – Richard Gall, poet (born 1776)
 30 May – John Millar, philosopher (born 1735)
 11 October – John Donaldson, miniature painter (born 1737; died in London)
 25 December – Andrew Lumisden, Jacobite (born 1720)
 Jean Glover, poet and singer (born 1758; died in Ireland)

The arts
 21 July – Greenock Burns Club is established to honour the memory of poet Robert Burns (died 1796) and Poems Ascribed to Robert Burns is published.
 James Hogg publishes Scottish Pastorals, Poems, Songs.

See also 
 1801 in the United Kingdom

References 

 
Scotland
Years of the 19th century in Scotland
1800s in Scotland